Voice of Peace (Kol HaShalom) was an offshore radio station that broadcast in the Middle East for 20 years from the former Dutch cargo vessel MV Peace (formally MV Cito), anchored off the Israeli coast in the Eastern Mediterranean. Founded by Abie Nathan and the New York-based Peace Ship Foundation, the station broadcast almost continuously between 19 May 1973 and November 1993. The station was relaunched but solely as an online station in August 2009. A second online channel called The Voice of Peace Classics was added in 2014.

History
The aim of the Voice of Peace was to communicate peaceful co-existence to the volatile Middle East. The output was popular music presented by mostly British DJs broadcasting live from the ship. The main on-air studio consisted of a Gates Diplomat mixer, Technics SL-1200 turntables, Sony CD Players, and Gates NAB cartridge machines, on which the jingles and commercials were played. The second studio, for production, had a Gates turntable, reel-to-reel tape recorders, and an NAB cartridge recording unit.

Voice of Peace was Israel's first offshore pop station and the first commercially funded private operation. The station's American PAMS, CPMG, JAM, and TM Productions jingles, English-speaking DJs, and Top 40 hits attracted many advertisers. Initially, the station transmitted on 1539 AM (announced as 1540 AM) and in 1980 added a signal at 100.0 FM.

Notable personalities were involved in broadcasting.  The Carpenters, Johnny Mathis and others recorded messages of peace. John and Yoko Lennon signed hundreds of peace posters which Abie Nathan could sell in hard times. During the mid-1970s, the station boasted more than 20 million listeners from the Middle East to southern Europe and Turkey, thanks to the format used by professional broadcasters led by Keith Ashton.

Transmitters
The original AM/MW transmitter was installed in New York before 1972 and consisted of two 25,000-watt Collins units and a Collins combiner, giving the station a potential 50 kW AM signal. The MW signal was broadcast from a centre-fed horizontal antenna slung between the fore and aft masts, a design similar to those used by Radio Veronica and later Laser 558. The station normally ran at 35 kW until late 1976, when it was decided to operate just one transmitter at a time, keeping the other in reserve. In 1985, Keith York's repair of the combiner enabled the two Collins units to be run together again, resulting in a large mailbag from Turkey, Crete, Greece, and Cyprus, areas the Voice of Peace message hadn't reached for nine years. After these AM transmitters became unserviceable, a Canadian Nautel 10 kW AM transmitter was installed.

A shortwave transmitter was used briefly on 6240 kHz but this was abandoned due to interference problems.

The 20 kW FM transmitter installed in Israel was manufactured by Harris. This, with the antenna array, delivered around 80 kW ERP (Effective Radiated Power) of stereo. A second 20 kW Harris FM transmitter was also installed on board the peace ship.

DJs / Presenters
Presenters with Voice of Peace included Tony Allan, Chris Phelan, Peter Quinn, Chris Pearson, Nathan Morley, Nigel Harris, Richard West (real name Richard Harding), 'Steaming' Steve Cromby, Steve Richards (real name Steve Joy), Arik Lev, Martin Murphy, Mike O' Sullivan, John Mc Donald, Dave Asher and Grant Benson. Steve Greenberg, who became a Grammy-winning producer and president of Columbia Records, was another early-1980s broadcaster. Kenny Page was one of the longest-serving presenters, on board from the 1970s to the 1990s.

Programming
The Voice of Peace was primarily in English, but a small output included Hebrew, Arabic, and French. Several shows ran for nearly its entire life, including Twilight Time (daily at 18:00, using the Platters hit of the name as its theme), the Classical Music Programme (daily from 19:30), and Late Night Affair (00.00-03.00).

The telephone forum chaired by Abie Nathan called "Kol Ha Lev" (Voice of the Heart) and then Ma La'asot? (?מה לעשות, "What to do?") was the only uncensored direct public dialogue between Israelis and Palestinians.

Government reaction
The Voice of Peace was tolerated by the Israeli Government, as Abie Nathan was a personality in the country; however, the IBA was alarmed at its popularity and set up a state-run pop service, Reshet Gimel, in May 1976. Nathan was imprisoned on several occasions for violating laws forbidding contact with enemy states and the PLO.

The sinking of the peace ship
Nathan decided to intentionally sink the ship in international waters on November 28, 1993 after promises of a broadcast license and mooring in Jaffa port failed, and he closed the station due to heavy losses and following the signing of the Oslo peace accords, which he assumed was validation of the station's mission. On the final day, he instructed the presenters to play the Beatles non-stop. The presenters on the final day included Nathan Morley, Matthew French, Bill Sheldrake and Clive Sinclair.

Abie Nathan's illness and death
Abie Nathan had a stroke in 1997 that left him partially paralyzed. He died in Tel Aviv on 27 August 2008 at 81. On 10 June 2007 Tel Aviv-Yafo decided to post a plaque on the Tel Aviv boardwalk at Gordon Beach, opposite where the Peace Ship had been anchored. This memorial plays recordings of Voice Of Peace, including the station callsign in Nathan's voice and an explanation in Hebrew and English.

Israeli radio station Radius 100 (on VoP's FM frequency) airs weekday tribute programs. The first hour is music in the format of Twilight Time. The second plays hits mostly from the 1970s, 1980s, and early 1990s.  Presenters include Gil Katzir, Mike Brand, and Tim Shepherd.

In 2003, NMC Music released a CD called the Voice of Peace, featuring songs and jingles from the station. As the Sun Sets, a film about Abie Nathan, soon followed, directed by Eytan Harris. Double CD compilations followed in 2007 and 2008.

Relaunch 
In August 2009, The Voice of Peace launched online streaming at 128 kbit/s. It returned on Saturday November 7, 2009 at 12.00 UTC at http://www.thevoiceofPeace.co.il
 	
By Christmas 2009, it featured some live programmes, as well as syndicated shows. The Voice of Peace is programmed by Mark Hanna, who was a regular presenter during summer 1992. Alan Roberts, a former programme director who spent about a year with the station in 1976 and 1977, also presents evening programmes. On August 24, 2010, former DJ (1987) Richard Doran Ticho returned to the one-hour program, Spotlight. On August 16, 2010, former DJ (1985) Andy Cox returned to broadcast a live interactive show on Monday and a chart countdown on Saturdays. He also hosted "Twilight Time" for over a year. November 24, 2010 saw Rob Charles (1986) return all-time number ones on Wednesday. On February 5, 2011 D, John Macdonald did several joint broadcasts from PulseFM studios in Scotland. John also hosted his show 'Late Night Affair'. In 2012 Chris Phelan stepped back aboard, under his new radio name Chris Williams. Chris was an original 1990 peace ship DJ and currently presents a daily live lunchtime show. New broadcasters included Mark St. John, presenting a live show featuring Progressive Rock music new and old, songs from then and now sending peace & love around the world with Pandora,  and Pete Peroni, an 80s music fanatic!
 		
In 2014, a second channel was added besides the mainstream Voice of Peace. While the main channel continues to offer a mix of contemporary music and oldies, the new 24-hour channel called The Voice of Peace Classic concentrates exclusively on oldies and classic hit songs.

The station had to shut down its broadcasts on 18 July 2020 as maintaining the station had become very difficult because of the COVID-19 epidemic adding that "we will do everything possible to come back to you in the near future." as the announcement read.

See also
Arutz Sheva
Pirate Radio

References

Sources
Radius 100FM Voice of Peace page
More pictures of the ship
Soundscapes VOP article
Remembering the Voice of Peace (oral history series)
Israeli Pirate radio - past and present

External links
The Voice of Peace official web site
VoiceOfPeace.com
Abie Nathan site

Defunct radio stations in Israel
Pirate radio stations
Peace organizations based in Israel
Offshore radio
Mass media in Tel Aviv
Radio stations established in 1973
Radio stations disestablished in 1993